Kaize Station is the name of two train stations in Japan:

 Kaize Station (Nagano) (海瀬駅)
 Kaize Station (Nagasaki) (皆瀬駅)